Aïn Sebaâ – Hay Mohammadi is a prefecture (district) of eastern Casablanca, in the Casablanca-Settat region of Morocco. The district covers an area of 26.7 square kilometres (10.3 square miles) and as of 2004 had 407,892 inhabitants.

Subdivisions
The district is divided into three arrondissements:

Aïn Sebaâ
Hay Mohammadi
Roches Noires

References

Districts of Casablanca